Lee Jun-Young (born December 26, 1982) is a South Korean football player. He previously played for FC Seoul and Incheon United.

He was indefinitely expelled from the Korean Football League System for his involvement in a match-fixing scandal in July 2011.

References

1982 births
Living people
South Korean footballers
FC Seoul players
Incheon United FC players
Gimcheon Sangmu FC players
K League 1 players
Kyung Hee University alumni
Association football forwards